Southwest Medical University (formerly Luzhou Medical College, Sichuan Medical University, is a medical university in Luzhou, Sichuan, China.

History
The school was first established in 1951 as Southern Sichuan Doctors' School. In 1958, the school was renamed as Luzhou Specialist School of Medicine. In 1978, it was authorized to grant bachelor's degrees and changed its name to Luzhou Medical College (Luyi ( for short).

Name changes
In 2015, Luzhou Medical College was authorized to change its name to Sichuan Medical University. However, West China Medical Center of Sichuan University, which was called "Sichuan Medical College" between 1953 and 1985, protested that the new name was too similar to its former name. In 2016, the school changed its name again to Southwest Medical University.

Campuses
The university has two campuses: Zhongshan and Chengbei, covering 1,004,700 square meters in total.

The Zhongshan Campus is on Mount Zhongshan and is surrounded by the Yangtze River and the Tuo River. The area has a multitude of green camphor trees and local flowers. The new Chengbei campus has modern teaching facilities.

Academics
The approximate 17,000 students who typically occupy the college at any one time are from a wide variety of Chinese provinces, autonomous regions and municipalities, and many come from other countries. The staff number at around 2,560, with 520 of them being onsite professors or associate professors whose focus includes Western medicine, traditional Chinese medicine, and a hybrid combination of the two.

Facility wise, the college has five non-subordinating hospitals and 39 teaching hospitals with a total of 15,500 patient beds.

References 

 Official site 
 Official documents about the rename  
西南医科大学简介 

Medical schools in China
Luzhou
Universities and colleges in Sichuan
1951 establishments in China